The 2017 Russian Curling Olympic Trials were held from December 27 to 29 at the Ice Cube Curling Center in Sochi. The winner of this event, which was determined by a "best of seven" series, represented the Olympic Athletes from Russia team at the 2018 Winter Olympics. There was only a women's event, as the men's team representing Russia at the qualification event failed to qualify for the Olympics, and the mixed doubles team was already chosen.  

The team skipped by Victoria Moiseeva won the event 4-1 over the team skipped by Anna Sidorova.

Teams

Results
All draw times are listed in Moscow Time (UTC+03:00).

Final standings

Draw 1
December 27, 8:30

Draw 2
December 27, 18:30

Draw 3
December 28, 8:30

Draw 4
December 28, 18:30

Draw 5
December 29, 8:30

Video
Video broadcasting are on official "Russian Curling TV" channel on YouTube.

  (December 27, 08:30 UTC+3)
  (December 27, 18:30 UTC+3)
  (December 28, 08:30 UTC+3)
  (December 28, 18:30 UTC+3)
  (December 29, 08:30 UTC+3)

References

External links
Russian Olympic Trials | Curlingzone

Curling competitions in Russia
Olympic Curling Trials
Russian Olympic Curling Trials
Olympic Curling Trials
Sports competitions in Sochi
Russian Olympic Curling Trials
Russian Olympic Curling Trials
Olympic Curling Trials